Established: 1978
Type: Public
Location: University System of Maryland, USA
Website: http://www.mees.umd.edu]]

The University System of Maryland's Graduate Program in Marine-Estuarine-Environmental Sciences (sometimes referred to as MEES Graduate Program, or just MEES) objective is the training of graduate students, working toward the M.S. or Ph.D. degree, with research interests in fields of study that involve interactions between biological, physical and chemical systems in the marine, estuarine, freshwater or terrestrial environments. The program is grouped into four "foundations," specifically Environment and Society, Earth and Ocean Systems, Ecological Systems and Environmental Molecular Science and Technology.

History 
The MEES Program has been in existence for more than 40 years and functions as an environmental graduate program for the University System of Maryland. The Program serves as an example of cooperation among multiple institutions within the state of Maryland (UMCP, UMBC, UMB, UMES, & UMCES).

Notable alumni: • Ricky Arnold, NASA mission specialist-educator astronaut • Thomas S. Bianchi, University of Florida biogeochemist Susan L. Williams (1951–2018), marine biologist, University of California, Davis

Notable faculty: • Robert Ulanowicz, theoretical ecologist

Facilities 
Research is conducted in the laboratories and facilities of the University of Maryland, College Park (UMD), University of Maryland, Baltimore (UMB), University of Maryland, Baltimore County (UMBC), or University of Maryland, Eastern Shore (UMES), and University of Maryland Center for Environmental Science (UMCES): the Chesapeake Biological Laboratory at Solomons, Maryland; the Horn Point Laboratory (HPL) near Cambridge, Maryland; and the Appalachian Laboratory in Frostburg, Maryland; or at the Institute of Marine and Environmental Technology (IMET) in Baltimore. 
CBL and HPL are located on the Chesapeake Bay and include facilities for the culture of marine and estuarine organisms. Berthed at CBL are the university's research vessels. HPL allows access to extensive marshes, intertidal areas, oyster shoals, tidal creeks, and rock jetties. The AL facility supports research in terrestrial and freshwater ecology. On the university campuses and IMET in Baltimore are additional laboratory facilities for microbiology; biotechnology; water chemistry; cellular, molecular, organismal biology, and remote sensing of the environment.

References 

 Peterson's (1)
 Peterson's (2)

External links 
 MEES Graduate Program

University System of Maryland